The 2021 NCAA Rifle Championships took place from March 12 to March 13 in Columbus, Ohio, at the Lt. Hugh W. Wylie Rifle Range. The tournament went into its 41st NCAA Rifle Championships, after having been canceled mid-event in 2020 due to COVID-19, and featured eight teams across all divisions. 48 athletes including 40 from qualifying teams and 8 at-large individuals competed in the event.

Team results

Individual results

 Note: Table does not include eliminations

References

2021 in American sports
2021 in sports in Ohio
NCAA Rifle Championship